In Greek mythology, Scephrus (Ancient Greek: Σκέφρου) was an Arcadian prince as the son of King Tegeates of Tegea and Maera, daughter of the Titan Atlas. He was the brother of Leimon, Archedius, Gortys and Cydon.

Mythology 
When Apollo and Artemis visited the land of Tegea, Scephrus came to the god and had a private conversation with him. Leimon thinking that they were plotting against him, rushed on his brother and murdered him. To punish the death of Scephrus, Artemis shot Leimon dead afterwards.

Notes

References 

 Pausanias, Description of Greece with an English Translation by W.H.S. Jones, Litt.D., and H.A. Ormerod, M.A., in 4 Volumes. Cambridge, MA, Harvard University Press; London, William Heinemann Ltd. 1918. . Online version at the Perseus Digital Library
 Pausanias, Graeciae Descriptio. 3 vols. Leipzig, Teubner. 1903. Greek text available at the Perseus Digital Library.

Princes in Greek mythology
Deeds of Apollo
Deeds of Artemis
Arcadian mythology
Tegea